The municipal police are the local police of towns and cities in France outside the capital. There are 18,000 municipal police officers in 3,500 communities. The municipal police are one of the three components of French policing, alongside the National Police and the National Gendarmerie, with about 145,000 police and 98,000 soldiers respectively. 

Municipal policing in departments of Paris, Hauts-de-Seine, Seine-Saint-Denis, and Val-de-Marne is the responsibility of Paris Police Prefecture, part of the National Police.

Law enforcement roles 
Under Article 21 2 of the Code of Criminal Procedure, the duties of the municipal police include:

 security, safety and public order
 the correct application of the bylaws.
 monitoring and regulation of road traffic and the recording of traffic violations.
 routine screening for alcohol offenses.
 maintenance of law 78-6 of the Code of Criminal Procedure.
 assistance to citizens of the town.
 the laws of urban planning.
 reporting of crimes over which they have no jurisdiction.

The municipal police may carry out arrests as part of the act and are required to deliver any perpetrator to an officer of the national police or the national gendarmerie.

Numbers 

Approximately 20,000 municipal police officers provide about 13% of the total French law enforcement community.

The municipal police may also incorporate the duties of the forest rangers and game wardens (gardes champêtres) in rural areas.

Legal authority and legislation 
The French municipal police are under the direct authority of the mayor, who is charged with significant powers of police administration, according to the regulations in Article L. 2212-2 du Code général des collectivités territoriales (CGCT) (2212-2 of the General Code of Territorial (CGCT)) with a responsibility to ensure good order, safety, security, and public health, and also to provide an administrative function, known as the "police power of the mayor. "

Although the word "police" refers to the maintenance of order, the function mainly comprises the protection of citizens from disasters, and the task of regulating traffic and parking. To do so, municipalities are required to establish municipal police services, under the authority of the mayor for the task of enforcing local bylaws.

To implement the mayor's responsibility, municipalities can create appropriate services and hire two types of agents: the municipal police, the functions and status are discussed in this article, and Garde champêtre whose employment is often created in rural areas.

The general code regulating local authorities lays down the status of municipal police officers:

Activities 
Interventions of the municipal police are also carried out in coordination with other police forces; a mandatory agreement defines and limits the nature and location of their interventions and the manner in which they collaborate with other police forces. With the exception of the static guarding of buildings and surveillance of ceremonies, festivals and other events, without this agreement, the tasks of local police can only be exercised between 6 am and 23 pm. Overall supervision and regulation of the municipal police is under the jurisdiction the Ministry of the Interior, which is empowered to carry out inspections by agencies such as the IGPN.
Articles L 2212-5 (paragraph 4) and the L CGCT 2212-9, provide for inter-municipal police collaboration between municipalities or groups of municipalities.

The police officers recruited through the municipal council are considered primarily available to every mayor in his hometown for local policing. They may also be required to be sworn in by the district judge to provide services to the national police of neighbouring districts or to the gendarmerie in rural areas.

The municipal police do not generally carry firearms. At the request of the mayor, the prefect of the department in which the commune or municipality is located may authorise municipal police officers to be armed in certain circumstances or for special night work. In some cities, all municipal police officers are permanently armed.

Weapons
Whereas some French Municipal officers are equipped with firearms, many are equipped only with pepper spray, batons, and handcuffs, each municipal police agency may have different weapons, meaning that some municipal police may carry revolvers while others have more modern semi-automatic pistols. Since 2000, revolvers are chambered in .38 special, and semi-automatic pistols in .32 ACP. From 2016, semi-automatic pistols in 9mm are allowed.

Some of the sidearms utilized by the various municipal police are listed but not limited to:

Glock pistols
SIG Sauer P320
Beretta 92 (PAMAS G1 – French Beretta 92 copy)
Beretta APX
CZ P07
SIG Sauer Pro series
Smith & Wesson Model 65
Manurhin MR 73
Taurus 82

Ranks and rank insignia
 Municipal police officers, class C: 
  Gardien-brigadier stagiaire
  Gardien-brigadier
  Brigadier (name of Gardien-brigadier after 4 years of service)
  Brigadier-chef principal
 Municipal police officers, class B:
 Chef de service
 Chef de service principal de 2e classe
 Chef de service principal de 1e classe
 Municipal police officers, class A:
 Directeur de police municipale or Directeur principal de police municipale
Source:

See also 
 National Gendarmerie
 National Police (France)

References

Sources

2. ↑ Note: Section 21 of the Criminal Procedure Code confers municipal police officers with the status of deputy judicial police officers. As such, it empowers them to assist national police officers in the exercise of their duties, to report to their superiors any crimes, or offenses of which they have knowledge, and in accordance with the instructions of their superior officers, to discover and collect all information required for crime prevention and detection.
 
3. ↑ CGCT, art. L. 2212-6

4. ↑ CGCT, art. L. 2212-8

7. ↑ Art.  L 412-49 of the Code of Commons.

8. ↑ Art.  L 412-51 of the Code of Commons

10. ↑ Art.  412-53 of the Code of Commons

Bibliography 
 Franck Denion, Police municipale : missions et moyens, Editions Territoriales, municipal police missions and means Territoriales Editions, June 2006.

External links 
 (fr)  Observatoire National des Polices Municipales (National Observatory Font Municipales)
 (fr)  Police Online Site non-officiel de la Police Municipale (Police Online Unofficial Website of the Municipal Police)

Law enforcement agencies of France
Municipal law enforcement agencies